O'Brian White (born 14 December 1985, in Ocho Rios) is a Jamaican former footballer who played as a forward.

Career

Youth and college
White grew up in Jamaica before moving to Scarborough, Ontario in 2002 to live with his mother. He began playing football while attending Lester B. Pearson Collegiate Institute, where he was named the Most Valuable Player of the squad in 2004 and 2005.

White played college soccer at the University of Connecticut. He won the Hermann Trophy, the highest individual honor in NCAA Division I soccer and the Soccer America Player of the Year Award in 2007.

Professional
After signing a deal with Major League Soccer, he was selected fourth overall by Toronto FC in the 2009 MLS SuperDraft on 15 January 2009.
White made his debut for Toronto FC in an international friendly against the Argentinean side River Plate, at BMO Field on 22 July 2009, and made his MLS debut on 25 July 2009, against the Columbus Crew. He scored his first MLS goal on 15 August 2009, against D.C. United.
White won his first individual award with Toronto FC after being named MLS Goal of the Week in week 26 for his goal in the 3–2 victory against Colorado Rapids on 12 September 2009. On 25 April 2010, White scored his first goal on the 2010 Season in a 2–0 win against the Seattle Sounders FC.

White was taken by the Vancouver Whitecaps FC in the 2010 MLS Expansion Draft, but was traded to Seattle Sounders FC three hours afterwards.

After undergoing blood clot surgery, White was bought out of his contract by Seattle so that he'd no longer be part of the club's roster. However, he would stay with the club while they supported him during his recovery.

International
White has played for Jamaica's under-15, under-17 and under-20 national teams but through FIFA rules he remains eligible to represent either Jamaica or Canada at the senior level. However, in November 2010 White accepted an invitation from the Jamaican Senior Team to play against Costa Rica on the 17th. White did make his debut for Jamaica in the Costa Rica match that ended in a 0–0 draw.

Post-football
In 2014, in an article and interview with the Jamaican  Gleaner newspaper, White discussed the uncertainty regarding his potential return to football, citing the necessity of the use of blood-thinning medication which prevented him from playing even recreationally. He announced his intention to run football clinics, and sanguinely accepted the short-lived nature of a professional footballing career with a positive view of the future.

References

External links

University of Connecticut profile 

1985 births
Living people
UConn Huskies men's soccer players
Toronto FC players
Seattle Sounders FC players
Jamaican expatriates in Canada
Jamaican footballers
Jamaica youth international footballers
Jamaica international footballers
Expatriate soccer players in the United States
Expatriate soccer players in Canada
Jamaican expatriates in the United States
Toronto FC draft picks
Major League Soccer players
Hermann Trophy men's winners
All-American men's college soccer players
Association football forwards
People from Saint Ann Parish